Augustina López (born Augustina Romero) was a Mexican actress of indigenous ancestry who appeared in a string of Hollywood films later in life. She reportedly broke into the industry through an association with actress Delores Del Rio.

Selected filmography 

 Thunder Below (1932)
 The Wolf Song (1929)
 Tide of Empire (1929)
 Redskin (1929)
 The Gay Defender (1927)
 El indio Yaqui (1927)
 The Night of Love (1927)
 The Were-Tiger (1925)
 The Crow's Nest (1922)
 A Sailor-Made Man (1921)
 Lightning Bryce (1919)

References 

1842 births
1932 deaths
Mexican film actresses
Mexican actresses
Native American actresses